The 1811 Pennsylvania gubernatorial election occurred on October 8, 1811. Incumbent Democratic-Republican governor Simon Snyder won re-election over Federalist candidate William Tilghman, the Chief Justice of the Pennsylvania Supreme Court, by a wide margin. Two of the major policy goals on which Snyder campaigned were increasing spending for infrastructural upgrades and authorizing the transfer of governmental operations from Lancaster to Harrisburg.

Results

References

1811
Pennsylvania
Gubernatorial
November 1811 events